This is a list of schools in Worcestershire, England.

State-funded schools

Primary and first schools

Abberley Parochial Primary School, Abberley
Abbey Park First School, Pershore
Abbeywood First School, Redditch
Arrow Valley First School, Redditch
Ashton-under-Hill First School, Ashton under Hill
Astley CE Primary School, Astley
Astwood Bank Primary School, Astwood Bank
Badsey First School, Badsey
Batchley First School, Redditch
Bayton CE Primary School, Bayton
Beaconside Primary School, Rubery
Belbroughton CE Primary School, Belbroughton
Bengeworth CE Academy, Bengeworth
Beoley First School, Beoley
Bewdley Primary School, Bewdley
Birchen Coppice Academy, Kidderminster
Blackwell First School, Blackwell
Blakedown CE Primary School, Blakedown
Bredon Hancock's CE First School, Bredon
Bretforton Village School, Bretforton
Broadheath CE Primary School, Lower Broadheath
Broadwas CE Primary School, Broadwas
Broadway First School, Broadway
Burlish Park Primary School, Stourport-on-Severn
Callow End CE Primary School, Callow End
Carnforth School, Worcester
Castlemorton CE Primary School, Castlemorton
Catshill First School, Catshill
Chaddesley Corbett Endowed Primary School, Chaddesley Corbett
Charford First School, Charford
Chawson First School, Droitwich Spa
Cherry Orchard Primary School, Worcester
Church Lench CE First School, Church Lench
Claines CE Primary School, Claines
Cleeve Prior CE Primary School, Cleeve Prior
Clent Parochial Primary School, Clent
Clifton upon Teme Primary School, Clifton upon Teme
Comberton Primary School, Kidderminster
Cookley Sebright Primary School, Cookley
Coppice Primary School, Hollywood
Crabbs Cross Academy, Redditch
Cranham Primary School, Warndon
Cropthorne-with-Charlton CE First School, Cropthorne
Crowle CE First School, Crowle
Crown Meadow First School, Alvechurch
Cutnall Green CE Primary School, Cutnall Green
Defford-cum-Besford CE First School, Defford
Dines Green Community Academy, Worcester
Dodford First School, Dodford
Eckington CE First School, Eckington
Eldersfield Lawn CE Primary School, Eldersfield
Elmley Castle CE First School, Elmley Castle
Fairfield First School, Fairfield
Far Forest Lea Memorial CE Primary School, Far Forest
Feckenham CE Primary School, Feckenham
Finstall First School, Bromsgrove
Fladbury CE First School, Fladbury
Flyford Flavell Primary School, Flyford Flavell
Foley Park Primary Academy, Kidderminster
Franche Primary School, Kidderminster
Great Malvern Primary School, Malvern
Great Witley CE Primary School, Great Witley
Grimley and Holt CE Primary School, Grimley
Grove Primary School, Malvern
Hagley Primary School, Hagley
Hallow CE Primary School, Hallow
Hanbury CE First School, Hanbury
Hanley Swan St Gabriel's with St Mary's CE Primary School, Hanley Swan
Hartlebury CE Primary School, Hartlebury
Harvington CE First School, Harvington
Heronswood Primary School, Kidderminster
Himbleton CE Primary School, Himbleton
Hindlip First School, Fernhill Heath
Hollymount School, Worcester
Holy Redeemer RC Primary School, Pershore
Holy Trinity School, Kidderminster
Holyoakes Field First School, Redditch
Hollywell Primary School, Rubery
Honeybourne First School, Honeybourne
Inkberrow Primary School, Inkberrow
Kempsey Primary School, Kempsey
Leigh and Bransford Primary School, Leigh Sinton
Lickey End First School, Lickey End
Lickey Hills Primary School, Lickey
Lickhill Primary School, Stourport-on-Severn
Lindridge St Lawrence's CE Primary School, Lindridge
The Littletons CE Academy, South Littleton
The Lyppard Grange Primary School, Worcester
Madresfield CE Primary School, Madresfield
Malvern Parish CE Primary School, Malvern
Malvern Wells CE Primary School, Malvern Wells
Malvern Wyche CE Primary School, Malvern
Martley CE Primary School, Martley
Matchborough First School Academy, Redditch
Meadow Green Primary School, Wythall
Meadows First School, Bromsgrove
Millfields First School, Bromsgrove
Moons Moat First School, Redditch
North Worcester Primary School, Worcester
Northleigh CE Primary School, Malvern
Northwick Manor Primary School, Worcester
Norton Juxta Kempsey CE Primary School, Norton
Nunnery Wood Primary School, Worcester
Oak Hill First School, Redditch
Oasis Academy Warndon, Warndon
Offenham CE First School, Offenham
Offmore Primary School, Kidderminster
Oldbury Park Primary RSA Academy, Worcester
Ombersley Endowed First School, Ombersley
Orchard Primary School, Pershore
The Orchards School, Bromsgrove
Our Lady of Mount Carmel RC First School, Redditch
Our Lady Queen of Peace RC Primary School, Worcester
Overbury CE First School, Overbury
Pebworth First School, Pebworth
Pendock CE Primary School, Pendock
Perry Wood Primary School, Worcester
Pinvin CE First School, Pinvin
Pitmaston Primary School, Worcester
Powick CE Primary School, Powick
Red Hill CE Primary School, Worcester
Romsley St Kenelm's CE Primary School, Romsley
Rushwick CE Primary School, Rushwick
St Ambrose Catholic Primary, Kidderminster
St Andrew's CE First School, Barnt Green
St Andrew's CE School, Evesham
St Anne's CE Primary School, Bewdley
St Barnabas CE First & Middle School, Drakes Broughton
St Barnabas CE Primary School, Worcester
St Bartholomew's CE Primary School, Stourport-on-Severn
St Catherine's CE Primary School, Kidderminster
St Clement's CE Primary, Worcester
St George's CE First School, Redditch
St George's CE Primary School, Worcester
St George's CE School, Kidderminster
St George's RC Primary School, Worcester
St James' CE Primary School, Malvern
St John's CE Primary School, Kidderminster
St Joseph's RC Primary School, Droitwich Spa
St Joseph's RC Primary School, Malvern
St Joseph's RC Primary School, Warndon
St Luke's CE First School, Redditch
St Mary's CE Primary School, Kidderminster
St Mary's RC Primary School, Broadway
St Mary's RC Primary School, Evesham
St Matthias CE Primary School, Malvern
St Oswald's CE Primary School, Kidderminster
St Peter's Droitwich CE Academy, Droitwich Spa
St Peter's RC First School, Bromsgrove
St Richard's CE First School, Evesham
St Stephen's CE RSA Academy, Redditch
St Thomas More RC First School, Redditch
St Wulstan's RC Primary School, Stourport-on-Severn
Sedgeberrow CE First School, Sedgeberrow
Somers Park Primary School, Malvern
Stanley Road Primary School, Worcester
Stoke Prior First School, Stoke Prior
Stourport Primary Academy, Stourport-on-Severn
Suckley Primary School, Suckley
Sutton Park Primary RSA Academy, Kidderminster
Swan Lane First School, Evesham
Sytchampton Endowed Primary School, Sytchampton
Tardebigge CE First School, Tardebigge
Tenacres First School, Redditch
Tenbury CE Primary Academy, Tenbury Wells
Tibberton CE First School, Worcester
Tudor Grange Primary Academy Perdiswell, Worcester
Upper Arley CE Primary School, Upper Arley
Upton Snodsbury CE First School, Upton Snodsbury
Upton-upon-Severn CE Primary School, Upton-upon-Severn
The Vaynor First School, Redditch
Webheath Academy Primary School, Redditch
Welland Primary School, Welland
Westlands First School, Droitwich Spa
Whittington CE Primary School, Whittington
Wilden All Saints CE Primary School, Stourport-on-Severn
Wolverley Sebright Primary Academy, Wolverley
Woodrow First School, Redditch
Wychbold First School, Wychbold

Middle schools

Abbey Park Middle School, Pershore
Alvechurch CE Middle School, Alvechurch
Aston Fields Middle School School, Bromsgrove
Birchensale Middle School, Redditch
Blackminster Middle School, South Littleton
Bredon Hill Academy, Ashton under Hill
Catshill Middle School, Catshill
Church Hill Middle School, Redditch
Ipsley CE RSA Academy, Redditch
Parkside Middle School, Bromsgrove
St Barnabas CE First & Middle School, Drakes Broughton
St Bede's RC Middle School, Redditch
St Egwin's CE Middle School, Evesham
St John's CE Middle Academy, Bromsgrove
St Nicholas' CE Middle School, Pinvin
Walkwood CE Middle School, Redditch
Westacre Middle School, Droitwich Spa
Witton Middle School, Droitwich Spa
Woodfield Academy, Redditch

Secondary and upper schools

Baxter College, Kidderminster
The Bewdley School, Bewdley
Bishop Perowne Church of England College, Worcester
Blessed Edward Oldcorne Catholic College, Worcester
The Chantry School, Martley
The Chase School, Malvern
Christopher Whitehead Language College, Worcester
The De Montfort School, Evesham
Droitwich Spa High School, Droitwich Spa
Dyson Perrins Church of England Academy, Malvern
Hagley Roman Catholic High School, Hagley
Hanley Castle High School, Hanley Castle
Haybridge High School, Hagley
Holy Trinity School, Kidderminster
King Charles I School, Kidderminster
North Bromsgrove High School, Bromsgrove
Nunnery Wood High School, Worcester
Pershore High School, Pershore
Prince Henry's High School, Evesham
Ridgeway Secondary School, Astwood Bank
RSA Academy Arrow Vale, Redditch
St Augustine's High School, Redditch
South Bromsgrove High School, Bromsgrove
The Stourport High School, Stourport-on-Severn
Tenbury High Ormiston Academy, Tenbury Wells
Trinity High School and Sixth Form Centre, Redditch
Tudor Grange Academy, Redditch, Redditch
Tudor Grange Academy, Worcester, Worcester
Waseley Hills High School, Rubery
Wolverley Church of England Secondary School, Wolverley
Woodrush High School, Wythall

Special and alternative schools

The Aspire Academy, Worcester
The Beacon Primary Pupil Referral Unit, Redditch
Chadsgrove School, Catshill
Continu Plus Academy, Kidderminster
The Forge Secondary Short Stay School, Redditch
Fort Royal Community School, Worcester
The Kingfisher School, Redditch
Newbridge School, Worcester
Perryfields Primary Pupil Referral Unit, Worcester
Pitcheroak School, Redditch
Regency High School, Warndon
Rigby Hall School, Aston Fields
Riversides School, Worcester
Vale of Evesham School, Evesham
Wyre Forest School, Kidderminster

Further education
Heart of Worcestershire College
Kidderminster College
South Worcestershire College
Worcester Sixth Form College

Independent schools

Primary and preparatory schools
Abberley Hall School, Abberley
RGS The Grange, Claines
RGS Springfield, Worcester

Senior and all-through schools

Abbey College, Malvern
Bowbrook House School, Peopleton
Bredon School, Bushley
Bromsgrove School, Bromsgrove
Heathfield Knoll School, Wolverley
The King's School, Worcester
Madinatul Uloom Al Islamiya School, Kidderminster
Malvern College, Malvern
Malvern St James, Malvern
RGS Dodderhill, Droitwich Spa
River School, Worcester
Royal Grammar School Worcester, Worcester

Special and alternative schools

Abigail's Place, Spetchley
Bridge School Malvern, Hanley Swan
Cambian New Elizabethan School, Hartlebury
Compass Community School Vicarage Park, Stottesdon
Cotswold Spa Hospital School, Broadway
Gloverspiece School, Ladywood
Lokrum Fields, Stoke Pound
New College Worcester, Worcester
Norton College, Norton
Nurture Learning, Kidderminster
Our Place School, Bransford
Sunfield Children's Home, Clent
Wribbenhall School, Bewdley

Worcestershire
Schools in Worcestershire
Worcestershire
Lists of buildings and structures in Worcestershire